Taming Sari Tower is a 24-story, 110-meter-tall gyro tower in Malacca City, Malacca, Malaysia. It is the first and tallest gyro tower in Malaysia.

Name
The name of the tower, Taming Sari was taken from the legendary keris that which belonged to Hang Tuah.

History
The tower was opened to the public on 18 April 2008 and officiated by Chief Minister of Malacca, Mohd Ali Rustam on 17 May 2008.

Design
The design of the tower is from a kris called Taming Sari.

References

2008 establishments in Malaysia
Buildings and structures in Malacca City
Tourist attractions in Malacca
Towers completed in 2008
Towers in Malaysia